James M. "Jace" Sayler (born February 27, 1979) is a former professional American football defensive tackle. He was signed by the New England Patriots as an undrafted free agent in 2001. He played college football at Michigan State.

Sayler has also been a member of the Washington Redskins and San Francisco 49ers.  

After Jace's career-ending back injury with the 49ers, he has undergone multiple operations over the years. While traveling for treatments and therapy for his back he met his wife Christine. Jace and Christine have two children and currently reside in the Midwest where they raise their family.

Early years
Sayler played high school football at McHenry High School West Campus in McHenry, Illinois, where he was an all-state selection at tight end and defensive end.

College career
After graduating from high school, Sayler attended Michigan State University. Sayler switched to defensive tackle in his junior season of 1999, finishing with 46 tackles and three sacks. He started every game of his senior season in 2000, recording 53 tackles.

Professional career

New England Patriots
Sayler was signed as an undrafted free agent by the New England Patriots after going undrafted in the 2001 NFL Draft. Sayler made the Patriots' 53-man roster out of training camp and started the 2001 season opener in place of an injured Richard Seymour at nose tackle. He played in two games for the Patriots before being placed on injured reserve on October 5. He was re-signed by the Patriots following the season, but was released on September 1, 2002. He was signed to the Patriots' practice squad two days later, and released again on September 5. He spent the 2002 season out of football.

Washington Redskins
Sayler was signed by the Washington Redskins on January 2, 2003, and released from the team on July 25, 2003.

San Francisco 49ers
Sayler was signed by the San Francisco 49ers on August 15, 2003, and waived/injured on August 26, 2003 after suffering a back injury.

External links
New England Patriots bio

Players of American football from Illinois
Sportspeople from Rockford, Illinois
American football defensive tackles
Michigan State Spartans football players
New England Patriots players
Washington Redskins players
San Francisco 49ers players
1979 births
Living people